Stefano Proetto (born 8 March 1985 in Gräfelfing, Bavaria, Germany) is an Italian racing driver. He has competed in series such as the Formula Renault 3.5 Series, Formula 3 Euro Series and Formula Renault V6 Eurocup. He won the race at Germany's Norisring on the way to finishing fifth overall in the 2010 Volkswagen Scirocco R-Cup season. He was also the winner of the 2000 Margutti Cup.

References

External links
Official website

1985 births
Living people
Italian racing drivers
German racing drivers
German Formula Three Championship drivers
Formula 3 Euro Series drivers
Formula Renault V6 Eurocup drivers
World Series Formula V8 3.5 drivers
Racing drivers from Bavaria
People from Munich (district)
Sportspeople from Upper Bavaria
German sportspeople of Italian descent

EuroInternational drivers
Kolles Racing drivers